Stan Wawrinka was the two-time defending champion but lost to Márton Fucsovics in the quarterfinals.

Fucsovics went on to win his first ATP World Tour singles title, defeating Peter Gojowczyk in the final, 6–2, 6–2. Fucsovics became the first Hungarian player to win an ATP World Tour singles title since Balázs Taróczy in 1982.

Seeds
The top four seeds receive a bye into the second round.

Draw

Finals

Top half

Bottom half

Qualifying

Seeds

Qualifiers

Qualifying draw

First qualifier

Second qualifier

Third qualifier

Fourth qualifier

References

External links
 Main Draw
 Qualifying Draw

Singles